National Secondary Route 115, or just Route 115 (or ), is a National Road Route of Costa Rica, located in the Heredia province.

Description
In Heredia province the route covers San Pablo canton (San Pablo district).

References

Highways in Costa Rica